The 2022 Los Angeles elections were held on June 7, 2022. Voters elected candidates in a nonpartisan primary, with runoff elections scheduled for November 8, 2022. Eight of the fifteen seats in the City Council were up for election while three of the seven seats in the LAUSD Board of Education were up for election. The seat of Mayor of Los Angeles is up for election due to incumbent Eric Garcetti's term limit. The seats of the Los Angeles City Controller and the Los Angeles City Attorney were also up for election, as their incumbents, Mike Feuer and Ron Galperin, were running for mayor and California State Controller respectively.

Municipal elections in California are officially nonpartisan; candidates' party affiliations do not appear on the ballot.

Mayor

City Attorney

Candidates

Declared 
Hydee Feldstein Soto, attorney and neighborhood councilmember
Faisal Gill, civil rights attorney
Kevin James, broadcaster and former Assistant U.S. Attorney for Southern California
Teddy Kapur, attorney and partner at Pachulski Stang Ziehl & Jones LLP
Richard Kim, deputy city attorney and former president of the Korean Prosecutors Association
Marina Torres, litigator and Assistant U.S. Attorney
Sherri Onica Valle Cole, attorney and educator

Withdrew 
Rick Zbur, executive director of Equality California

Endorsements

Results

City Controller

Candidates

Declared 
Stephanie Clements, assistant director of Public Works
Reid Lidow, scholar and aide to Eric Garcetti
Kenneth Mejia, Certified Public Accountant
David T. Vahedi, co-founder of the Westside Neighborhood Council and two-time candidate for District 5
Paul Koretz, city councilmember for District 5

Withdrew 
Madeline Cortez Le, activist
Rob Wilcox, spokesperson for the Los Angeles City Attorney (remained on ballot; endorsed Koretz)

Fundraising 
Paul Koretz had a substantial lead in early fundraising, followed by David Vahedi and Kenneth Mejia. Candidates received 6-to-1 matching funds from the city, with Mejia receiving the most ($428,000).

Endorsements

Results

City Council

District 1

Candidates

Declared 
Gil Cedillo, incumbent councilmember
Eunisses Hernandez, public policy advocate

Did not make ballot 
Elaine Alaniz, filmmaker and crisis responder
Ronald Duarte, community organizer
Jesus Jesse Rosas, former LAUSD employee

Withdrew 
Brian Morrison, member of the Los Feliz Neighborhood Council

Endorsements

Results

District 3

Candidates

Declared 
Bob Blumenfield, incumbent councilmember
Scott Silverstein, businessman

Did not make ballot 
Chris Champion, businessman
John Hernandez
Mikhail Maniyan, businessman

Withdrew 
Alexander Tsao
Yasmine Pomeroy, educator

Endorsements

Results

District 5

Candidates

Declared 
Jimmy Biblarz, attorney, faculty at UCLA School of Law, union member and activist
Scott Epstein, social sciences researcher
Katy Young Yaroslavsky, deputy for Los Angeles County Supervisor Sheila Kuehl
Sam Yebri, community leader, attorney, and former city commissioner

Did not make ballot 
Daniel Bahr
Molly Basler, owner of Inside Out Fitness/Wellness
Kristina Irwin, real estate agent
Dory Frank
Josh Nadel

Withdrew 
Jeff Ebenstein, director of policy for Paul Koretz
Janessa LaVoice

Endorsements

Results

District 7

Candidates

Declared 
Monica Rodriguez, incumbent councilmember
Elisa Avalos, community advocate

Did not make ballot 
Reuben Garcia, volunteer public advocate
Kevin Davis
Shirley Kim

Results

District 9

Candidates

Declared 
Curren Price, incumbent councilmember
Dulce Vasquez, college administrator at Arizona State University

Did not make ballot 
Adriana Cabrera
David Cunningham
Miguel I. Lemus

Withdrawn 
Nick Pacheco, former city councilor from the 14th district

Endorsements

Results

District 11

Candidates

Declared 
Erin Darling, civil rights lawyer
Traci Park, attorney
Allison Holdorff Polhill, chief advisor to LAUSD board member Nick Melvoin
Jim Murez, Venice Neighborhood Council President
Greg Good, Commissioner on the City of Los Angeles Board of Public Works
Midsanon "Soni" Lloyd, public school teacher
Michael Newhouse, president of the Venice Neighborhood Council
Matthew Smith, U.S. Army veteran

Did not make ballot 
Christopher Baker, international trade adviser
Gary Copeland, photographer
Cristian Letelier, property manager
Ronnie McCowan, community organizer
Vincent Sulaitis, security guard

Withdrew 
Mike Bonin, incumbent councilmember
Maryam Zar, city commissioner and founder of Womenfound

Endorsements

Results

District 13

Candidates

Declared 
Mitch O'Farrell, incumbent councilmember
Albert Corado, community organizer
Stephen Johnson, Los Angeles County Deputy Sheriff
Hugo Soto-Martinez, labor organizer
Kate Pynoos, former homelessness policy adviser to Councilman Mike Bonin

Did not make ballot 
Carlos H. Flowers, self-identified defense sales representative
Dylan Kendall, designer and founder of Hollywood Arts
Rachael Rose Luckey, transgender housing rights advocate and Rampart Village Neighborhood Council President

Withdrew 
Mary Hellman, real estate agent
Clarendon K. "Clay" Johnston, community activist
Chad Michael Manuel, adjudicator

Endorsements

Results

District 15

Candidates

Declared 
Tim McOsker, former chief of staff to James Hahn and police union lobbyist
Danielle Sandoval, businesswoman
Anthony D. Santich, business professional
Bryant Odega, teacher, community organizer for climate justice, and a former member of the Harbor Gateway Neighborhood Council

Did not make ballot 
Rick Thomas, citizen advocate
Andrew M. Bak-Boychuk, educator
Pati Lawrence, marketing consultant
Mark Contreras, youth and senior advocate
Robert M. Miller, artist and environmental activist
Shannon Ross, neighborhood council member

Withdrew 
Christian L. Guzman, environmentalist
LaMar Lyons, administrator for nonprofits

Endorsements

Results

LAUSD Board of Education

District 2

Candidates

Declared 
Maria Brenes, leader of InnerCity Struggle
Rocio Rivas, political activist
Miguel Angel Segura, public school teacher
Erica Vilardi-Espinosa, member of the Los Feliz Neighborhood Council

Withdrew 
Raquel Zamora

Did not make ballot 
Jerell Benjamin Johnson
Miho Murai, attorney
Erika Ochoa

Endorsements

Results

District 4

Candidates

Declared 
Gentille Barkhordarian, electrical engineer 
Nick Melvoin, incumbent board member
Tracey Schroeder, elementary school teacher

Did not make ballot 
Raissa White
Kellie N. Williams

Withdrew 
Midsanon "Soni" Lloyd, public school teacher
Negar Nikgohar

Endorsements

Results

District 6

Candidates

Declared 
Jesus Arana, police sergeant and educator
Kelly Gonez, incumbent board member
Marvin Rodriguez, Spanish teacher and veteran

Did not make ballot 
Jesie Balbuena
Benito B. Bernal

Endorsements

Results

Ballot measures

Measure BB

References 

Los Angeles
Los Angeles
Elections
2022